Ahraura is a town and a municipal board in Mirzapur district (distance 60 kilometres by road) in the Indian state of Uttar Pradesh.

Geography
It has an average elevation of 87 metres (285 feet).

Demographics
 India census, Ahraura had a population of 23,142. Males constitute 52% of the population and females 48%. Ahraura has an average literacy rate of 52%, lower than the national average of 59.5%; with 63% of the males and 37% of females literate. 18% of the population is under 6 years of age.

Tourism
Ahraura has many places of interest such as Lakhaniya Dari waterfalls, Chuna dari and Bhandari devi temple. There are sites with Cave paintings that are believed to be prehistoric.

Culture and religions
The main religions of Ahraura Constituency are Hindu and Muslims.

Festivals

All major Festivals Like Holi, Deepawali, Eid, Dussehra etc. are celebrated with full zeal and joy. In Months of July, August and September there are many cultural and fun fair are organised at different places in Ahraura.

Economics
Ahraura has been an historical center of trade in the region, Lately for Forest Products such as, Wooden Toys, Khair (Kattha, used in Beetle/Paan), Tendu-Patta (used in preparing smoke-cigars/beedee), Tree-raisins/Lava pan vandar, and earlier for Food Grains and Vegetables. The nearby forests yield many a valued medicinal herbs, with a few rare to find anywhere else.

The city is very famous for the pink stones of its mountain rocks. Geographically the Stones found are considered in varieties Chunar's Sand Stones, But are different in attributes such as Stronger in Hardness, the unique quality of the stone is that it shines Pink when touched with water, as in rain, a Rare Pink Marble, recently used in huge quantity in the Monumental Parks erected by Mayawati Government, in the cities of Lucknow and NOIDA.

Banks
Ahraura has modern banking facilities with ATM's. All the major banks like Allahabad Bank, State Bank Of India, Bank of Baroda, Punjab National Bank and Grameen Bank have their branches in Ahraura.

Notable locations 

Ahraura has many famous holy places: there is a temple situated in rocky mountain and there is stone inscription of Emperor Ashoka, one of the Minor Rock Edicts of Ashoka. An important monument accounts for stone-scripture by Emperor Ashoka, in a script possibly Pali, a mark of Buddhist Influence, which in that period, might have been a site of distribution of food by the monastery, thus contributing the name Bhandari. Near the Southern End of the city, near the Water Reservoir, is a Stone Pillar, that too is believed to be erected by Emperor Ashoka, with a script/note in Pali, mistaken as a riddle to be solved to reach the hidden wealth of Sumedha (mentioned in "Chandrakanta" written by Devaki Nandan Khatri, also successfully produced as TV Serial By Nirja Guleri).

The city has many famous structures/temples within its boundaries, the two most visited are Durga Devi temple and Bhandari Devi temple. Durga Devi temple is situated at a mountain at the south edge of the city and Bhandari Devi temple is situated at a mountain at the north edge of the city. The city also has a temple named as Radha Krishna temple in the mid of the city market. There are many architectural structures, scattered in the periphery of the town speaking of its rich history and culture. Ahraura market was one of the oldest market in eastern Uttar Pradesh.

References

Cities and towns in Mirzapur district